Elek Bacsik (22 May 1926 – 14 February 1993) was a Hungarian-American jazz guitarist and violinist. He was the cousin of guitarist Django Reinhardt.

Career
Bacsik was born in Budapest, Hungary. He was the son of Árpád Bacsik and Erzsébet Pócsi.

He studied classical violin at the Budapest Conservatory before moving to jazz guitar. He worked in a big band with Jozsef Quitter and Geza Szabo and recorded for the first time in his career with this band in 1943. A few years later he went on tour in Europe and Lebanon with Mihaly Tabanyi. He was hired by Renato Carosone to be in a quartet with Peter Van Wood and Gegè Di Giacomo in which he played bass, violin, and guitar. When he lived in Paris, he accompanied American musicians who were passing through, such as Lou Bennett, Dizzy Gillespie, Quentin Jackson, Art Simmons, and Clark Terry. He also supported French singer Serge Gainsbourg. In 1966, he moved to the U.S. and until 1974 accompanied Teresa Brewer. In the 1970s he recorded as a leader on violin and electric violin. He played at the Newport Jazz Festival in 1974 and ten years later at the Olympic Games Jazz Festival in Los Angeles.

Discography

As leader
 The Electric Guitar of the Eclectic Elek Bacsik (Fontana, 1962)
 Guitar Conceptions (Fontana, 1963)
 I Love You (Bob Thiele Music, 1974)
 Bird and Dizzy: A Musical Tribute (Flying Dutchman, 1975)

As sideman
 Barbara, Barbara Chante Barbara (Philips, 1964)
 Barbara, Au Bois De Saint-Amand (Philips, 1965)
 Lou Bennett, Dansez et Revez (Phono 2017)
 Serge Gainsbourg, Gainsbourg Confidentiel (Philips, 1964)
 Serge Gainsbourg, 1963 Théâtre des Capucines (Mercury, 2001)
 Dizzy Gillespie, Dizzy on the French Riviera (Philips, 1962)
 Dizzy Gillespie, New Wave (Philips, 1963)
 Quincy Jones, $ (Reprise, 1972)
 Jeanne Moreau, Jeanne Moreau No.2 12 Chansons (Jacques Canetti 1967)
 Claude Nougaro, No. 2 (Philips, 1963)

Bibliography 

 Balval Ekel: Elek Bacsik - Un homme dans la nuit. La-Neuville—Aux-Joutes. 2015. 
 Géza Gábor Simon: Season of the Rain - Elek Bacsik Bio-discography / Esős évszak - Bacsik Elek bio-diszkográfia, Budapest, 2016.

References

Sources
 Barnett, Anthony. Almost Like Being in Bop: a Not-So-Brief Account of the Hidden History of the Swing to Recorded Bebop and Progressive Violin in America and Europe. Lewes, East Sussex: AB Fable, 2005. More information on his recordings on violin on AB Fable Bulletin : violin improvisation studies

External links 
 Elek Bacsik on www.djangostation.com  
 Biography on www.about-django.com  

1926 births
1993 deaths
Musicians from Budapest
American jazz guitarists
American jazz violinists
American male violinists
American people of Hungarian-Romani descent
American people of Romani descent
American Romani people
Hungarian emigrants to the United States
Hungarian jazz guitarists
Male guitarists
Hungarian Romani people
Hungarian violinists
Romani violinists
20th-century American violinists
20th-century American guitarists
American male guitarists
20th-century American male musicians
American male jazz musicians
Hungarian male musicians